The Clavey River is a tributary of the Tuolumne River in the Sierra Nevada, located in the Stanislaus National Forest and Tuolumne County, California. Via the Tuolumne River, the Clavey is part of the San Joaquin River watershed.

Geography
The river flows mostly north-south, which is rare for streams in the western Sierra, which generally flow from east to west. Between Twomile and Cottonwood Creeks there is a concrete bridge carrying Forest Route 1N04.

The Clavey receives Bear Springs Creek and Quilty Creek from the right before reaching a final bridge that carries Forest Route 1N01. Below this point the Clavey flows through a rugged canyon inaccessible except by boat.

Features
Clavey Falls provides a thrilling landmark to rafters and kayakers heading downstream.  The river has notable swimming holes eroded into the granitic Sierra bedrock.

The Clavey is special because it has some of the highest biotic integrity of any river in California, remaining in relatively good flora/fauna/ecological condition. This river is unique because it still harbors a pre-glacial remnant population of coastal rainbow trout.

Conservation
The Clavey River is one of the few undammed rivers in California, despite the many attempts to do so by the Turlock Irrigation District.

A multi-stakeholder group known as the Clavey River Ecosystem Project (CREP) is currently developing a baseline study and recommendations for the preservation of the Clavey.

See also

List of rivers of California

References

External links
Clavey River Ecosystem Project
Tuolumne River Trust
Clavey River information from Friends of the River
LocalHS.com: Scouting Out Clavey River

Tuolumne River
Rivers of the Sierra Nevada (United States)
Rivers of Tuolumne County, California
Stanislaus National Forest
Tributaries of the San Joaquin River
Rivers of Northern California
Rivers of the Sierra Nevada in California